Frank Travieso (born 21 March 1980 in Havana) is a Cuban-born American cyclist.

Major results
2006
 1st Stage 2 International Cycling Classic
2007
 1st Tour of the Bahamas
 1st Stages 3 & 7 Tour of Belize
2009
 1st Stage 6 Tour of America's Dairyland
2012
 1st Carolina Cup
2013
 3rd Athens Twilight Criterium
2014
 3rd Athens Twilight Criterium
2015
 3rd Athens Twilight Criterium
2018
 3rd Athens Twilight Criterium
2020
 1st Overall Vuelta a Nicaragua
1st Stages 1 & 3

References

External links

1980 births
Living people
American male cyclists
Cuban male cyclists